The Pentagon Barracks, also known as the Old United States Barracks, is a complex of buildings located at the corner of State Capitol Drive and River Road in Baton Rouge, Louisiana, in the grounds of the state capitol. The site was used by the Spanish, French, British, Confederate States Army, and United States Army and was part of the short-lived Republic of West Florida. During its use as a military post the site has been visited by such notable figures as Zachary Taylor,                     
Lafayette, Robert E. Lee, George Custer, Jefferson Davis, and Abraham Lincoln.

French, British and Spanish fort

Pierre Le Moyne d'Iberville visited the area circa 1700. France retained the Baton Rouge site until the British took control in 1763.

In 1779, during the American Revolutionary War, the British erected a dirt Fort New Richmond on the banks of the Mississippi River.  Bernardo de Gálvez, colonial governor of Louisiana (New Spain), arrived on 20 September 1779 and found three hundred British troops garrisoning Fort New Richmond.  In the Battle of Baton Rouge (1779), engineers under Spanish Governor Gálvez quickly constructed a siege line, enabling the Spanish troops to shell Fort Richmond; the British surrendered the next day.  The Spanish garrisoned the fortification and renamed it Fort San Carlos.

Republic of West Florida
American and remaining British settlers in Louisiana resisted Spanish control and rebelled in 1810 to establish the Republic of West Florida.  They flew their Bonnie Blue Flag over Fort San Carlos throughout the republic's short three-month life.  The Republic surrendered the city of Baton Rouge to United States authorities on December 10, 1810.

U. S. military post at Baton Rouge

American forces renamed the fort Post at Baton Rouge.  The Post at Baton Rouge served as the assembly point for American troops going to the Creek War in 1813-14 and to the Battle of New Orleans in 1814-15.  The Army built the Baton Rouge Barracks just north of the Post at Baton Rouge and in 1819 demolished the former Fort San Carlos.

United States Army Captain James Gadsden designed the Baton Rouge Barracks and took charge of their construction from 1819 to 1825.  The soldiers completed four two-story brick buildings, forming four sides of a regular pentagon, by 1825, hence the nickname "Pentagon Barracks."  They also built a commissary-warehouse building, forming the fifth side of the pentagon, in 1821, but tore down this defective building within a few months due to faulty construction. The Pentagon Barracks could house one thousand troops.

The Army in 1825 established a large adjacent Baton Rouge Arsenal and Ordnance Depot to serve the then-Southwestern United States.

American Civil War
The United States Army occupied the Baton Rouge Barracks and Arsenal until January 1861, when the State of Louisiana seized the post and turned the operation of the arsenal over to the Confederate States of America.  The Confederacy held Baton Rouge until its evacuation during the capture of New Orleans in April 1862. Union troops took back and reoccupied the Baton Rouge complex in May 1862.

The Confederates attempted unsuccessfully to retake Baton Rouge in the Battle of Baton Rouge (1862).  Union authorities renamed the Barracks and Arsenal as Fort Williams after Union General Thomas Williams, who was killed in the battle.  Union soldiers built earthworks to protect the complex, incorporating an old Indian mound into the defenses.

Louisiana State University

In 1884, the General Assembly of Louisiana passed a resolution allocating the full usage of the buildings and grounds of the Pentagon Barracks to Louisiana State University. The University gained full possession of the grounds in 1886 and the buildings were used as dormitories for the students. The grounds were used by LSU until the university moved to its current location in 1926.

Sigma Iota fraternity was founded there on November 27, 1904 as a secret society for Spanish-American students under the name La Colonia Hispano-Americana. Soon after its founding La Colonia Hispano-Americano decided to change its name to Sociedad Hispano-Americana in December 1904.

Modern use
In 1951, ownership of the Barracks was transferred to the State of Louisiana and on July 26, 1973, the buildings were placed on the National Register of Historic Places. The Pentagon Barracks still houses the offices of the lieutenant governor and private apartments for state legislators.

See also
History of Louisiana
National Register of Historic Places listings in East Baton Rouge Parish, Louisiana

References

External links

Capitol Complex attractions
Pentagon Barracks, at National Park Service

1779 establishments in the British Empire
American Civil War army posts
American Civil War on the National Register of Historic Places
American Revolution on the National Register of Historic Places
Baton Rouge, Louisiana
Buildings and structures in Baton Rouge, Louisiana
Defunct museums in Louisiana
Louisiana State University buildings and structures
Military facilities on the National Register of Historic Places in Louisiana
National Register of Historic Places in Baton Rouge, Louisiana
University and college dormitories in the United States